LP 944-20 is a dim brown dwarf of spectral class M9 located about 21 light-years from the Solar System in the constellation of Fornax. With a visual apparent magnitude of 18.69, it has one of the dimmest visual magnitudes listed on the RECONS page.

Physical characteristics
Due to short rotational period, this young brown dwarf is displaying strong and frequent X-ray flares, and possessing a strong magnetic field reaching 135 G at the photosphere level. On 15 December 1999, an X-ray flare was detected. On 27 July 2000, radio emission (in flare and quiescence) was detected from this brown dwarf by a team of students at the Very Large Array.

Observations published in 2007 showed that the atmosphere of LP 944-20 contains much lithium and that it has dusty clouds.

Notes

References

External links
"The 100 nearest star systems", Research Consortium on Nearby Stars

M-type brown dwarfs
Fornax (constellation)
J03393521-3525440